Véronique Rivière (born Véronique Tartakovsky in Suresnes, February 5, 1959) is a French singer-songwriter.

Biography 
Rivière's father is the Russian-French television producer , and her mother is a journalist. She began her career by playing minor acting roles on television, and in 1982, as a cabaret singer at Café de la Gare in Paris.

To date, Rivière has released six studio albums and several singles.  From 1991 to 2001, she appeared as a backing vocalist on four albums of Swiss singer Stephan Eicher.

Rivière is currently performing the role of Francesca Lavie, which was previously played by Diane Tell, in the musical Je m'voyais déjà. Written by Laurent Ruquier and directed by Alain Sachs, this production premiered in Paris in 2008 and features the songs of Charles Aznavour.

Discography

Albums

Singles

References

External links 
  

1959 births
Living people
French-language singers
French singer-songwriters
People from Suresnes
French people of Russian descent
Riviere, Veronique